Jaap Schröder or Jaap Schroeder (31 December 1925 – 1 January 2020) was a Dutch violinist, conductor, and pedagogue.

He studied at the Amsterdam Conservatory and at the Sorbonne in France.  In the 1960s he was a member of the Dutch early music group Concerto Amsterdam and made recordings with Gustav Leonhardt, Anner Bylsma, Frans Brüggen and others. Since 1981 he served as the director and concertmaster of the Academy of Ancient Music, and in 1982 he was appointed the visiting music director of the Smithsonian Chamber Players.  He served as a faculty member at the Schola Cantorum Basiliensis, Yale School of Music and the Luxembourg Conservatory.

Works

References

External links
 Jaap Schröder Discography indexed by date, by composer and by work.
  Additional biography

1925 births
2020 deaths
University of Paris alumni
Yale School of Music faculty
Musicians from Amsterdam
Dutch classical violinists
Male classical violinists
Concertmasters
Dutch performers of early music
Baroque-violin players
Conservatorium van Amsterdam alumni
Violin pedagogues
Dutch music educators
21st-century classical violinists
21st-century male musicians